The 1973 Soviet Chess Championship was the 41st edition of USSR Chess Championship. Held from 2-26 October 1973 in Moscow. The tournament was won by Boris Spassky. The final were preceded by semifinals events at Frunze, Kirovabad, Lvov e Voronezh.

Table and results

References 

USSR Chess Championships
Championship
Chess
1973 in chess
Chess